Justine Anne Russell (born 16 November 1974) is a New Zealand former  cricketer who played as a right-arm medium bowler. She appeared in 1 Test match and 5 One Day Internationals for New Zealand in 1995 and 1996. She played domestic cricket for Southern Districts, Wellington and Canterbury.

References

External links

1974 births
Living people
Cricketers from Invercargill
New Zealand women cricketers
New Zealand women Test cricketers
New Zealand women One Day International cricketers
Southern Districts women cricketers
Wellington Blaze cricketers
Canterbury Magicians cricketers